The Carthaginian tree frog (Hyla carthaginiensis) is a species of tree frog from humid coastal areas of northeastern Algeria and northwestern Tunisia. It is most closely related to Hyla meridionalis, the Mediterranean or stripeless tree frog, of which it was formerly considered a population. The two species likely overlap in range in Algeria.

References

Amphibians described in 2019
Amphibians of North Africa
Hyla